The history of bras (brassières; variously pronounced) is inextricably entwined with the social history of the status of women, including the evolution of fashion and changing views of the female body.

Women throughout history have used a variety of garments and devices to support, cover, restrain, reveal, or modify the appearance of their breasts. Bra or bikini-like garments are depicted in art of female athletes of the Minoan civilization, ca. 14th century BCE. And there is some evidence to suggest that even from the Greco-Roman period, women had developed specialized bra-like garments for the purpose of supporting the breasts.  By the 14th century CE the proto-bra was in development in Europe and from approximately the 16th century CE onward, the undergarments of wealthier women in the Western world were dominated by the corset. Corsets varied in length from short ones, which only supported the bust, to longer ones which were also used to shape the waist. In the latter part of the 19th century, women experimented with various alternatives such as splitting the corset into a girdle-like shaping device for the lower torso and transferring the upper part to devices suspended from the shoulder.

By the early 20th century, garments more closely resembling contemporary bras had emerged, though large-scale commercial production did not occur until the 1930s.  The metal shortages of World War I encouraged the end of the corset and by the time the war ended, most fashion-conscious women in Europe and North America were wearing bras. From there the bra was adopted by women in other parts of the world including Asia, Africa, and Latin America.

Antiquity

Greece

There is some evidence to suggest that a specialized garment meant to support and contain women's breasts may date back to Ancient Greece, though most of this evidence is literary rather than visual or textile.  In Book 14 of Homer's Iliad, written in the archaic period of Classical Antiquity, the poet refers to Aphrodite's "embroidered girdle" as being "loosed from her breasts," perhaps indicating that this may be a reference to a decorated breast-band rather than a girdle or belt, as is often interpreted.  There is at least one example of late-Hellenic sculpture that seems to confirm this, depicting the goddess wrapping a stróphion (from stróphos "twisted band" + the diminutive suffix -ion) around her chest.  

The stróphion is also mentioned in Aristophanes' plays Lysistrata and Women at the Thesmophoria. However, it is currently impossible to tell whether the stróphion was an everyday garment worn by the average woman or an item of clothing reserved for certain situations or specific types of women.  Some sources suggest that it may have been in use as a common undergarment while others are doubtful.  Most early Grecian sculpture and vase paintings that depict women in states of undress show no indication of any kind of breast-band, instead revealing the shape of the breast through draped clothing, or even the nipple itself, with no sign of an intervening item of clothing between dress and skin.

Rome

There is considerably more evidence for the use of the Roman strophium, their adaptation of the stróphion, which was also referred to as the fascia, fasciola, taenia, or mamillare.  This garment, which apparently could be made from a variety of materials, was mentioned in writings by Martial, Ovid, and in the Scriptores Historiae Augustae and is depicted in art such as the "Bikini Mosaic" in Sicily, which dates to the 4th century CE.

The Middle Ages

Dates are uncertain, but it is believed that by the High Middle Ages, bra-like garments meant to support and restrain the breasts were already in use by at least some women in western Europe.  Both Henri de Mondeville, surgeon to King Phillip the Fair of France and Konrad Stolle, writing over a hundred years apart (c. 1315 CE and c. 1480 CE respectively) mention "breast bags" or "shirts with bags" that women used to contain their breasts.  Stolle calls these inventions "indecent" and another anonymous writer of 15th century Germany talks of how many women would make these garments and then wear them, and says of one woman: "all the young men that look at her, can see her beautiful breasts..."  The fashion worn by women of status in this period probably necessitated the wearing of specialized undergarments. Because of the lifted, separated position of the breasts which could only be achieved by the presence of separated cups.

There is quite a bit of visual evidence of these garments' existence, mostly from the 15th century in the form of playing cards, illustrated manuscripts, and more.  Physical evidence of such undergarments was found in 2008 in Lengberg Castle, Austria, where fragments of four bra-like undergarments were discovered dating to the 15th century CE.   The garments were of three different styles but all had separate cups and although none were found with attached skirts as depicted in the visual evidence, there is reason to believe that this wasn't the case originally. Sometime before the garments were discarded and the skirts were removed. Perhaps in order to reuse the fabric they were made of.

The corset

"Bodies" 
No one knows who invented the corset, but it probably came into being sometime around the turn of the 16th century CE.  During this period, the lifted, separated "apple breasts" look, so popular in the Middle Ages, began to go out of fashion and were replaced in popularity with the look of a compressed bust.  The corset (called "a pair of bodies" in English or "paire de corps" in French at this time because they came in two pieces) formed the chest and torso into a smooth, conical shape that worked with the farthingale to create the illusion of a tiny waist.

In the mid 17th century bodies began to be called "stays" and were usually boned with baleen instead of reeds.  Some of these garments were made in one piece, but they still retained the same general shape as the earlier bodies and did not feature cups like a bra.  This remained unchanged until the end of the 18th century, with the invention of shortened stays.

Shortened stays 
In the 1780s and 1790s, the shape of stays changed radically to suit the changing fashions of the times.  It was around this time that stays started to be called corsets in France, but many of these "shortened stays" or "short stays," as they were sometimes called in Britain, resembled earlier support garments as much as they resembled stays, with fitted cups that held the breasts apart and bands only as wide as the ribs or shorter, instead of waist-length.

Re-emergence of the bra

Victorian dress reform movement 

The evolution of the bra from the corset was driven by two parallel movements: health professionals' concerns about the cruel, constraining effects of the corset, and the clothing reform movement of feminists who saw that greater participation of women in society would require emancipation from corsetry. Prominent among these were the Rational Dress Society, the National Dress Reform Association, and the Reform Dress Association.

In practice, early bras made little market penetration. They were expensive, and only educated wealthy reformers wore them to any extent.

American women who made important contributions included Amelia Bloomer (1818–1894) ("When you find a burden in belief or apparel, cast it off") and Dr. Mary Edwards Walker (1832–1919). In the UK, notable figures in the movement included Constance Lloyd, wife of Oscar Wilde.

Early bra designs and patents
There are considerable differences of opinion about who invented the modern brassière. Patent dates indicate some of the landmark developments; a large number of patents for bra-like devices were granted in the 19th century:

A bra-like device that gave a "symmetrical rotundity" to the wearer's breasts was patented in 1859 by Henry S. Lesher of Brooklyn, New York. In 1863, a "corset substitute" was patented by Luman L. Chapman of Camden, New Jersey. Historians refer to it as a "proto-bra."

In 1876, dressmaker Olivia Flynt was granted four patents covering the "true Corset" or "Flynt Waist." It was aimed at larger-breasted women. Reformers stimulated demand for and probably purchased these early garments on "hygienic" grounds because of their concerns about the corset. Initially, Flynt's garments were only available by mail order, but they eventually appeared in department and clothing stores and catalogues. Her designs won a bronze medal at the Massachusetts Charitable Mechanics Association in 1878, at the Cotton Centennial Exposition in Atlanta in 1884–5, and at the Columbian Exposition in Chicago in 1893.

According to Life magazine, in 1889 Herminie Cadolle of France invented the first modern bra.
It appeared in a corset catalogue as a two-piece undergarment, which she originally called the corselet gorge, and later le bien-être (or "the well-being"). Her garment effectively cut the traditional corset in two: The lower part was a corset for the waist and the upper part supported the breasts with shoulder straps. Her description reads "designed to sustain the bosom and supported by the shoulders." She patented her invention and showed it at the Great Exhibition of 1889. The company, still family-owned, claims today that Herminie "freed women by inventing the first Bra."
By 1905, the upper half was sold separately as a soutien-gorge, the name by which bras are still known in France. She also introduced the use of "rubber thread" or elastic.

In 1893, Marie Tucek received a U.S. patent for a device that consisted of separate pockets for each breast above a metal supporting plate and shoulder straps fastened by hook-and-eye. This invention more closely resembled the modern bra known today, and was a precursor to the underwire bra.

Home-sewn garments competed with factory-made, ready-to-wear garments. The bra was at first an alternative to the corset, as a negligée or at-home wear, or worn by women with medical issues stemming from corsets. After the straight-fronted corset became fashionable in the early 20th century, a bra or "bust supporter" became a necessity for full-busted women because the straight-fronted corset did not offer as much support and containment as the Victorian styles. Early bras were either wrap-around bodices or boned, close-fitting camisoles (both worn over the corset). They were designed to hold the bust in and down against the corset, which provided upward support.

Advertising of the times, typically in periodicals, stressed the advantages of bras in health and comfort over corsets and portrayed garments with shoulder supports in a mono-bosom style and with limited adaptability. Their major appeal was to those for whom lung function and mobility were priorities, rather than outer appearance.

20th century bra designs

The 1910s 
Sigmund Lindauer from Stuttgart-Bad Cannstatt, Germany developed a bra for mass production in 1912 and patented it in 1913. It was mass-produced by Mechanischen Trikotweberei Ludwig Maier und Cie. in Böblingen, Germany.  With metal shortages, World War I encouraged the end of the corset. By the time the war ended, most fashion-conscious women in Europe and North America were wearing bras. From there the bra was adopted by women in Asia, Africa, and Latin America.

In 1910, Mary Phelps Jacob (known later in life as Caresse Crosby), a 19-year-old New York socialite, purchased a sheer evening gown for a debutante ball. At that time, the only acceptable undergarment was a corset stiffened with whalebone. Mary had large breasts and found that the whalebone visibly poked out around her plunging neckline and from under the sheer fabric. Dissatisfied with this arrangement, she worked with her maid to fashion two silk handkerchiefs together with some pink ribbon and cord.
 Her innovation drew immediate attention that evening and, at the request of family and friends, she made more of her new device. When she received a request for one from a stranger, who offered a dollar for her efforts, she realized that her device could turn into a viable business.

On 3 November 1914, the U.S. Patent Office issued the first U.S. patent for the "Backless Bra." Crosby's patent was for a device that was lightweight, soft, and comfortable to wear, and naturally separated the breasts, unlike the corset, which was heavy, stiff, uncomfortable, and had the effect of creating a "monobosom."

Crosby managed to secure a few orders from department stores, but her business never took off. Her husband Harry Crosby discouraged her from pursuing the business and persuaded her to close it. She later sold the bra patent to the Warners Brothers Corset Company in Bridgeport, Connecticut, for $1,500 (roughly equivalent to $ in current dollars). Warner manufactured the "Crosby" bra for a while, but it did not become a popular style and eventually was discontinued. Warner went on to earn more than $15 million from the bra patent over the next 30 years.

Bras became more common and widely promoted over the course of the 1910s, aided by the continuing trend towards lighter, shorter corsets that offered increasingly less bust support and containment. In 1917 at the beginning of the U.S. involvement in World War I, the U.S. War Industries Board asked women to stop buying corsets to free up metal for war production. This was said to have saved some 28,000 tons of metal, enough to build two battleships.

It has been said that the bra took off the way it did in large part because of World War I, which shook up gender roles by putting many women to work in factories and in uniforms for the first time. The war also influenced social attitudes toward women and helped to liberate them from corsets. But women were already moving into the retail and clerical sectors. Thus the bra emerged from something that was once discreetly tucked into the back pages of women's magazines in the 1890s, to prominent display in department stores such as Sears, Roebuck, and Montgomery Ward by 1918. Advertising was now promoting the shaping of the bust to contemporary fashion demands, and sales reflected this.

The 1920s
This culminated in the "boyish" silhouette of the Flapper era of the 1920s, with little bust definition. The term (which in the mid-1910s referred to preteen and early-teenage girls) was adopted by the J. Walter Thompson advertising agency in the 1920s for their younger adult customers. The androgynous figure then in style downplayed women's natural curves through the use of a bandeau bra, which flattened breasts. It was relatively easy for small-busted women to conform to the flat-chested look of the Flapper era. Women with larger breasts tried products like the popular Symington Side Lacer that, when laced at the sides, pulled and helped to flatten women's chests. Yet some "bras" of the early 1920s were little more than camisoles.

In 1922, Russian immigrant Ida Rosenthal was a seamstress at the small New York City dress shop Enid Frocks. She and her husband William Rosenthal, along with shop owner Enid Bissett, changed the look of women's fashion. They noticed that a bra that fit one woman did not fit another woman with the same bra size. With $4,500 invested in their new business, they developed bras for all ages. Their innovation was designed to make their dresses look better on the wearer by increasing the shaping of the bandeau bra to enhance and support women's breasts. They named the company Maiden Form, a deliberate contrast with the name of a competitor, "Boyishform Company." Maiden Form routed Boyishform by 1924, accenting and lifting rather than flattening the bust. In 1927, William Rosenthal, the president of Maiden Form, filed patents for nursing, full-figured, and the first seamed uplift bra.

These fashion changes coincided with health professionals beginning to link breast care and comfort to motherhood and lactation, and campaigned against breast flattening. The emphasis shifted from minimizing the breasts to uplifting and accenting them. Women, especially the younger set, welcomed the bra as a modern garment.

While manufacturing was beginning to become more organized, homemade bras and bandeaux were still quite popular, usually made of white cotton, but they were little more than bust bodices with some separation.

The 1930s

The word "brassiere" was gradually shortened to "bra" in the 1930s. According to a 1934 survey by Harper's Bazaar, "bra" was the most commonly used expression for the garment among college women. In October 1932, the S.H. Camp and Company correlated the size and pendulousness of a woman's breasts to letters of the alphabet, A through D. Camp's advertising featured letter-labeled profiles of breasts in the February 1933 issue of Corset and Underwear Review. In 1937, Warner began to feature cup sizing in its products. Two other companies, Model and Fay-Miss, began to offer A, B, C and D cups in the late 1930s. Catalog companies continued to use the designations Small, Medium and Large through the 1940s. Adjustable bands were introduced using multiple eye and hook positions in the 1930s.

As with other women's products, consumer adoption was encouraged by successful advertising and marketing campaigns. Saleswomen played a key role, helping clients find the right garment, as did the changing role of women in society. Much of this marketing was aimed at young women.

Bras rapidly became a major industry over the 1930s, with improvements in fiber technology, fabrics, colours, patterns, and options, and did much better than the retail industry in general. Innovations included Warners' use of elastic, the adjustable strap, the sized cup, and padded bras for smaller-breasted women. In the US production moved outside of New York and Chicago, and advertising started to exploit Hollywood glamour and become more specialised. Department stores developed fitting areas, and customers, stores and manufacturers all benefited. Manufacturers even arranged fitting training courses for saleswomen. International sales started to form an increasing part of the U.S. bra manufacturer's market. Prices started to make bras available to a wider market, and home-made competition dwindled. Other major manufacturers of the 1930s included Triumph, Maidenform, Gossard, (Courtaulds), Spirella, Spencer, Twilfit, and Symington.

The culturally preferred silhouette among Western women during the 1930s was a pointy bust, which further increased demand for a forming garment.

The 1940s

The Second World War had a major impact on clothing. In the United States, military women were enlisted for the first time in the lower ranks and were fitted with uniform underwear. Willson Goggles, a Pennsylvania firm that manufactured safety equipment for manual workers, is believed to have introduced the plastic "SAF-T-BRA", designed to protect women on the factory floor. Advertising appealed to both patriotism and the concept that bras and girdles were somehow "protection". Dress codes appearedfor example, Lockheed informed their workers that bras must be worn because of "good taste, anatomical support, and morale".

Military terminology crept into product marketing, as represented by the highly structured, conically pointed Torpedo or Bullet bra, designed for "maximum projection". The bullet bra was worn by the Sweater Girl, a busty and wholesome "girl next door" whose tight-fitting outer garments accentuated her artificially enhanced curves. Underwire began to be used in bra construction.

For the movie, The Outlaw, which features actress Jane Russell, the producer and airplane designer Howard Hughes constructed the Cantilever bra for Russell to wear in the movie. Hughes constructed the bra on the principles of bridge building, with the goal of fitting and supporting Russell's breasts.  This innovative new design caused a stir, and many women sought to recreate the look in their own wardrobe.

The war presented unique challenges for industry. Women's occupations shifted dramatically, with far more employed outside the home, and severe material shortages limited design choices. Advertising, promotion, and consumerism were limited but started to appear directed at minorities (e.g., Ebony in 1945) and teens. Many manufacturers only survived by making tents and parachutes in addition to bras.  However, the war also freed the American industry from European influences, particularly French, and it became more distinctive. As in World War I, there was concern about the use of badly needed steel in corsets; in 1941 the British Government carried out a survey of women's usage of underwear that showed that "on average, women owned 1.2 bras (housewives 0.8 and agricultural workers 1.9)".

The 1950s

Following the Second World War, new kinds of material were increasingly available, and production and marketing increased, creating a demand for a greater variety of consumer goods, including bras. The baby boom specifically created a demand for maternity and nursing bras and television provided new promotional opportunities. Manufacturers responded with new fabrics, colors, patterns, styles, padding, and elasticity.

Hollywood fashion and glamour influenced women's choices more than ever, leading to the popularity of bras like the cone-shaped, spiral-stitched bullet bra that was worn by actresses like Patti Page, Marilyn Monroe, and Lana Turner, who was nicknamed the "Sweater Girl". Bullet bras allowed women to add a cup size to their bust.

Bras for pre-teen and girls entering puberty were first marketed during the 1950s. Prior to the introduction of training bras, young girls in Western countries usually wore a one-piece "waist" or camisole without cups or darts.

The 1960s
The 1960s reflected increasing interest in quality and fashion. Maternity and mastectomy bras began to find a new respectability, and the increasing use of washing machines created a need for products that were more durable. While girdles gave way to pantyhose, the bra continued to evolve. Marketing campaigns like those for the "Snoozable" and "Sweet Dreams" promoted wearing a bra 24 hours a day.

In October 1964, Rudy Gernreich released the "No Bra", a soft-cup, light-weight, seamless, sheer nylon and elastic tricot bra in sizes 32 to 36, A and B cups, manufactured by Exquisite Form. His minimalist bra was a revolutionary departure from the heavy, torpedo-shaped bras of the 1950s, initiating a trend toward more natural shapes and soft, sheer fabrics. He also designed an "All-in-None" design with a deep, plunging front, and a "No-Back" long-line version, which featured a contoured stretch-waistband that allowed a woman to wear a backless dress.

The Wonderbra was created in 1964 by Louise Poirier for Canadelle, a Canadian lingerie company. It has 54 design elements that lift and support the bustline while creating a deep plunge and push-together effect. First-year sales for the Wonderbra were approximated at US$120 million. They repositioned Wonderbra as a romantic, fashionable and sexy brand.

The 1970s 

In the 1970s, like other garment makers, bra manufacturers moved production offshore.

With the growing popularity of jogging and other forms of exercise, it became apparent that there was a need for an athletic garment for women's breasts. The first commercially available sports bra was the "Free Swing Tennis Bra" introduced by Glamorise Foundations, Inc. in 1975.  The first general exercise bra, initially called a "jockbra", was invented in 1977 by Lisa Lindahl and theater costume designer Polly Smith with the help of Smith's assistant, Hinda Schreiber. Both Lindahl and her sister, Victoria Woodrow, complained about their bad experience exercising in ordinary bras, having experienced runaway straps, chafing and sore breasts. During the course of Lindahl and Smith's exploration for a better alternative, it was suggested that what they needed was a jockstrap for women's breasts. In the costume shop of Royall Tyler Theatre at the University of Vermont, Lindahl and Smith actually sewed two jockstraps together and nicknamed it a "jockbra". It was later renamed a "jogbra".  One of their original Jogbras is bronzed and on display near the costume shop of the theatre. Two others are housed by the Smithsonian and another by the New York Metropolitan Museum of Art.

The 1980s 

Throughout the 1980s fashion led the way in the look and feel of bras. Western TV shows featured classy, powerful, and well-formed ladies, usually donning low-cut tops to show an enhanced chest with an equally classy matching bra.

The onset of classy and stylish Teddy suits also encompassed this decade and sales of silicone increased the need for bigger and more supportive bras.

Models and celebrities all donned fashionable and extravagant bras, showing these off at red carpets events become the norm.

The 1990s 
Manufacturers' marketing and advertising often appeals to fashion and image over fit, comfort and function. Since about 1994, manufacturers have re-focused their advertising, moving from advertising functional bras that emphasize support and foundation, to selling lingerie that emphasize fashion while sacrificing basic fit and function, like linings under scratchy lace.

The 2000s 
Two design challenges that bra manufacturers face at present seem paradoxical. On the one hand, there is a demand for minimal bras that allow plunging necklines and reduce interference with the lines of outer garments, such as the shelf bra. On the other hand, body mass and bust size is increasing, leading to a higher demand for larger sizes. Over a 10-year period, the most common size purchased in the UK went from 34B to 36C. In 2001, 27% of UK sales were D or larger.

The 2000s brought two large design changes to the bra. The molded one-piece, seamless bra cup became ubiquitous. They are heat-molded around round forms of synthetic fibers or foam that keeps their rounded shape. This construction can include padded bras, contour bras and so-called T-shirt bras. Also new and ubiquitous in the 2000s was the popularity of printed designs such as floral or patterned prints.

Bras are a billion-dollar industry ($15 billion in the US in 2001, £1 billion in UK.) that continues to grow. Large corporations such as HanesBrands Inc. control most bra manufacturing, Gossard, Berlei and Courtaulds with 34% of the UK market. Victoria's Secret is an exception.

The 2010s and 2020
In the late 2010s and early 2020, bralettes and soft bras started gaining in popularity, to the detriment of underwired and padded bras. At the same time popularity of brands like Victoria's Secret decreased significantly. In 2017, the sales of cleavage-boosting bras fell by 45% while at Marks & Spencer, sales of wireless bras grew by 40%. Some have attributed the rising popularity of bralettes to a new focus on the "athletic body, health and wellbeing," rather than "the male gaze," while others suggest a connection to the #MeToo movement.

Bralettes have also become popular during the COVID-19 lockdowns due to a focus on comfort while working from home. Sport bras sales increased 32% during the pandemic, while bralettes and wireless bras were up 5 percent.

History of the No-Bra Movement

Second-wave feminism and the Miss America protest 
In 1968, at the feminist Miss America protest, protestors symbolically threw a number of feminine products into a "Freedom Trash Can". These included bras, which were among items the protestors called "instruments of female torture" and accouterments of what they perceived to be enforced femininity. Individuals who were present said that no one burned a bra nor did anyone take off her bra.

However, respected author Joseph Campbell found a local news story that contradicted the feminists' statements, reporting that lingerie was in fact burned at least briefly that day. An article on page 4 of the Atlantic City Press reported, "Bra-burners blitz boardwalk". It stated, "As the bras, girdles, falsies, curlers, and copies of popular women’s magazines burned in the Freedom Trash Can, the demonstration reached the pinnacle of ridicule when the participants paraded a small lamb wearing a gold banner worded Miss America." A second story in the same newspaper written by Jon Katz did not mention burning lingerie, but Campbell interviewed Katz. Katz, who was present that day, confirmed that bras and other items had been set on fire: "...the fire was small, and quickly was extinguished." The feminists insisted afterward that the newspaper report was wrong.

Female reporter Lindsy Van Gelder who covered the protest drew an analogy between the feminist protesters and Vietnam War protesters who burned their draft cards, and the parallel between protesters burning their draft cards and women burning their bras was encouraged by some organizers including Robin Morgan. "The media picked up on the bra part," Carol Hanisch said later. "I often say that if they had called us 'girdle burners,' every woman in America would have run to join us."

Feminism and "bra-burning" became linked in popular culture. The analogous term "jockstrap-burning" has since been coined as a reference to masculism. While feminist women state they did not literally burn bras that day, some stopped wearing them in protest. Author and feminist Bonnie J. Dow has suggested that the association between feminism and bra-burning was encouraged by individuals who opposed the feminist movement. "Bra-burning" created an image that women weren't really seeking freedom from sexism, but were attempting to assert themselves as sexual beings. This might lead individuals to believe, as she wrote in her 2003 article "Feminism, Miss America, and Media Mythology," that the women were merely trying to be "trendy, and to attract men." Women associated with an act like symbolically burning their bra may be seen by some as law-breaking radicals, eager to shock the public. This view may have supported the efforts of opponents to feminism and their desire to invalidate the movement. Some feminist activists believe that anti-feminists use the bra burning myth and the subject of going braless to trivialize what the protesters were trying to accomplish at the feminist 1968 Miss America protest and the feminist movement in general.

Germaine Greer's book The Female Eunuch (1970) became associated with the anti-bra movement because she pointed out how restrictive and uncomfortable a bra could be. "Bras are a ludicrous invention", she wrote, "but if you make bralessness a rule, you're just subjecting yourself to yet another repression."

In 1984, feminist Susan Brownmiller took the position in her book Femininity that women without bras shock and anger men because men "implicitly think that they own breasts and that only they should remove bras."

Third-Wave Feminism 
Feminist author Iris Marion Young wrote in 2005 that the bra "serves as a barrier to touch" and that a braless woman is "deobjectified", eliminating the "hard, pointy look that phallic culture posits as the norm." Without a bra, in her view, women's breasts are not consistently shaped objects but change as the woman moves, reflecting the natural body. Other feminist anti-bra arguments from Young in 2005 include that training bras are used to indoctrinate girls into thinking about their breasts as sexual objects and to accentuate their sexuality. Young also wrote in 2007 that, in American culture, breasts are subject to "[c]apitalist, patriarchal American media-dominated culture [that] objectifies breasts before such a distancing glance that freezes and masters." Academic Wendy Burns-Ardolino wrote in 2007 that women's decision to wear bras is mediated by the "male gaze".

Non-Western equivalents
While the modern bra has evolved, almost directly, from the proto-bra of the Middle Ages, other cultures across the world and across history have invented garments that serve similar purposes.  This is only a short list; for a more in-depth view, please see each garment's separate page.

China 
Over the course of its long history, China has produced many different types of women's undergarments that serve congruent purposes to those of the European bra and corset. The most well-known example is the dudou (Chinese: 肚兜, 兜肚, or 兜兜; also known by other names), a diamond-shaped garment used to flatten the breasts and preserve the stomach qi, which was developed in the Qing dynasty.  Other similar items of clothing include the baofu (抱腹) from the Han dynasty; the liangdang (裲襠) from the Wei Jin period; the hezi (诃子) from the Tang dynasty; the moxiong (抹胸) from the Song dynasty; the hehuan jin (合欢襟) from the Yuan dynasty; and the zhuyao (主腰) from the Ming dynasty.

India
The first historical reference to breast-support garments in India is found during the rule of King Harshavardhana (1st century AD). Sewn bras and blouses were very much in vogue during the Vijayanagara empire and the cities brimmed with tailors who specialized in tight fitting of these garments. The half-sleeved tight bodice or kanchuka figures prominently in the literature of the period, especially Basavapurana (1237 AD), which says kanchukas were worn by young girls as well.

Vietnam 
The yếm is a traditional Vietnamese garment that evolved from the Chinese dudou, which was brought to Vietnam during the Ming Qing dynasty.  It was worn by women from all classes with a skirt called váy đụp.  Although the yếm's popularity died out in the 20th century due to Westernization, it has recently seen a revitalization with the invention of the modern áo yếm, which is slightly different in style.

See also
 Bra
 List of bra designs
 Undergarment
 Wonderbra

References

Further reading
 Berry, Cheree, Hoorah for the Bra. Abrams 2006.
 Cunnington, Cecil Willett and Phillis Emily Cunnington,  The History of Underclothes. Dover 1992 (reissue of London ed., 1951 by Michael Joseph)
 Ewing, Elizabeth and Webber, Jean. Fashion in Underwear (Paperback) Batsford 1971 
 Farrell-Beck, Jane and Gau, Colleen. Uplift: The Bra in America. Philadelphia: University of Pennsylvania Press, 2002 xvi, 243 pp. $35.00, . (for reviews, see next section)
 Greer, Germaine. The Female Eunuch (1970). 2002 edition Farrar Straus Giroux 
 Hollander, Anne. Bra Story: A Tale of Uplift. Slate 20 March 1997
 Pedersen, Stephanie. Bra: A Thousand Years of Style, Support & Seduction. Hardcover: 127 pages. David & Charles Publishers (30 November 2004). 
 Steele, Valerie. The Corset: A Cultural History Paperback: 208 pages Yale University Press (8 February 2003) 
 Summers, Leigh. Bound to Please: A History of the Victorian Corset. Berg Publishers (1 October 2003) 
 Warner, L. C. Always Starting Things. Warner Brothers, Bridgeport, Connecticut, 1948
 Ancient Indian Bras; kamat.com/kalranga
 Interview with Teresa Riordan, Massachusetts Institute of Technology
 "Bra – A Century of Suspension". San Francisco Chronicle. 28 October 2007.
 "100 years of the bra". Times of India. 15 July 2007.
 "Double Anniversary for bra". St Petersburg Times. 4 December 2007.
 "Gendered Fashion, Power, and Sexuality: A History of Women's Lingerie" 
 United States Patent 7234996 (2005)
 Clothing and Dress for Women in the Art of Ancient Greece

Journal articles
 Freeman SK (Winter 2004). "In Style: Femininity and Fashion Since the Victorian Era". Journal of Women's History. 16(4): 191–206. .

Documentaries

Videos
 Cheree Berry: Hoorah for the bra

External links

 
 How to measure bra size

Brassieres
Brassieres